Vayalar Ramavarma (25 March 1928 – 27 October 1975), better identified by the name of his birthplace, Vayalar, was an Indian poet and lyricist of Malayalam language. He was known for his poems as well as for over 1,300 songs he composed for 256 Malayalam films.

References

External links 
 
 

Indian filmographies